Pseudacraea kuenowii, or Kuenow's false acraea, is a butterfly in the family Nymphalidae. It is found in Nigeria, Cameroon, Gabon, the Republic of the Congo, Angola, the Democratic Republic of the Congo, Kenya, Uganda and Zambia.

Description

Ps. kuenowi strongly recalls Ps. hobleyi in the orange transverse band of the forewing and the white  median hand of the hindwing, but has in the basal part of the forewing instead of the black dots a thick black longitudinal streak in the cell and in 1 b.
 kuenowi Dew. (46 b). The orange transverse band of the forewing of almost uniform breadth between the costal margin and vein 3, its spot in cellule 1 b much shorter than that in cellule 2; the white median band of the hindwing is narrow, with an almost uniform breadth of 5-6 mm., and only reaches vein 1 b, cellules 1 a and 1 b being light yellowish nearly to the base. Congo, rare; mimics Planema poggei (58 d).
 neumanni  Thurau (= hypoxantha Jord.) only differs in having the orange median band of the forewing somewhat broader, distinctly wider at the costal margin than at vein 4, the spot in cellule 1 b as long as that in 2, while the white median band of the hindwing reaches the inner margin, towards which it is distinctly widened; the inner margin is only yellowish between the white band and the anal angle. Uganda. Ps. gottbergi Dew. (46 b) has on the forewing a narrow, somewhat curved transverse band of almost uniform breadth, which reaches the hindmargin near the hinder angle, is composed of nearly quadrate spots and has a spot also in the apex of the cell. The hindwing is dark red-brown with black streaks and narrow black marginal band. The forewing on both surfaces with a thick black longitudinal streak in the cell and in cellules 1 b and 2. This rare species is coloured and marked almost exactly like Ps. ruhama (46 c) and Planema elongata (58 b, c). Cameroons to the southern Congo region.

Subspecies
Pseudacraea kuenowii kuenowii — southern and eastern Democratic Republic of the Congo, Zambia
Pseudacraea kuenowii burgessi Jackson, 1951 — Uganda: slopes of Mount Elgon, Kenya: slopes of Mount Elgon
Pseudacraea kuenowii gottbergi Dewitz, 1884 — Nigeria, Cameroon, Gabon, Congo, Angola, western Democratic Republic of the Congo
Pseudacraea kuenowii hypoxantha Jordan, 1911 — Uganda
Pseudacraea kuenowii kigezi Jackson, 1956 — Uganda: west to the Kigezi and Ankole districts

Biology
The habitat consists of forests.

Adults mimic Acraea elongata.

References

Butterflies described in 1879
Limenitidinae
Butterflies of Africa
Taxa named by Hermann Dewitz